Val di Cava (formerly Giardino) is a village in Tuscany, central Italy, administratively a frazione of the comune of Ponsacco, province of Pisa. At the time of the 2001 census its population was 675.

Val di Cava is about 30 km from Pisa and 4 km from Ponsacco.

References 

Frazioni of the Province of Pisa